Akbom (Altai: Ак-Боом, Ak-Boom) is a rural locality (a selo) in Ongudaysky District, the Altai Republic, Russia. The population was 19 as of 2016. There is 1 street.

Geography 
Akbom is located 106 km southeast of Onguday (the district's administrative centre) by road. Iodro is the nearest rural locality.

References 

Rural localities in Ongudaysky District